Christine Abraham is an American mezzo-soprano. She earned her Master of Music degree at Manhattan School of Music under the tutelage of Patricia McCaffrey and Cynthia Hoffmann. Notable roles include Valencienne in The Merry Widow with Utah Opera, Despina in Così fan tutte with the Toledo Opera, Blanche in Dialogues of the Carmelites with the Palm Beach Opera and Susanna in Le nozze di Figaro with the Tulsa Opera.

As a soprano she has portrayed Countess in Le nozze di Figaro, Mimi in La bohème and Female Chorus in The Rape of Lucretia.

Abraham sang Bach's St. Matthew Passion (BWV 244) and Herr Gott, dich loben alle wir, BWV 130 with the Baldwin-Wallace College Bach Festival, his Christmas Oratorio (BWV 248) at the Bethlehem Bach Festival, and his St John Passion (BWV 245) with the Phoenix Symphony Orchestra. She has performed with the New York City Opera, Metropolitan Opera, Philadelphia Orchestra, Saint Louis Symphony and Boston Baroque and teaches at the San Francisco Conservatory of Music, California State University East Bay, and privately in San Leandro, California.

Abraham studied at the Music Academy of the West in 1988.

References

American mezzo-sopranos
American sopranos
Living people
People from San Leandro, California
Year of birth missing (living people)
Music Academy of the West alumni
Singers from California
Classical musicians from California
21st-century American women